Panic in Paradise is a 1960 Danish comedy film directed by Hagen Hasselbalch and starring Alf Kjellin.

Cast
 Alf Kjellin - Frederik
 Katarina Hellberg
 Mogens Brandt
 Dirch Passer - Greven
 William Brüel
 Helge Kjærulff-Schmidt - Gas & Vandmesteren
 Kirsten Olsen
 Vivi Ancher
 Olaf Ussing
 Paul Møller
 Ego Brønnum-Jacobsen

References

External links

1960 films
1960s Danish-language films
1960 comedy films
Danish black-and-white films
Danish comedy films